is a Japanese manga series written and illustrated by Aya Nakahara. It was serialized in Shueisha's josei manga magazine Cocohana from March 2019 to October 2021, with its chapters collected into eight tankōbon volumes. A live action film adaptation is set to premiere in Japan in May 2023.

Media

Manga
Written and illustrated by Aya Nakahara, Otonanajimi was serialized in Shueisha's Cocohana magazine from March 28, 2019, to October 28, 2021. Eight tankōbon volumes have been released from July 2019 to December 2021.

Volume list

Live-action film
In October 2022, it was announced that the series would be receiving a live action film adaptation, starring HiHi Jets member Mizuki Inoue and Rinka Kumada. The film is directed by Hiroto Takahashi, based on a screenplay written by Erika Yoshida. It is set to premiere in Japan on May 12, 2023.

References

External links
  

Josei manga
Live-action films based on manga
Manga adapted into films
Romantic comedy anime and manga
Shueisha manga